The 2016–17 SIU Edwardsville Cougars men's basketball team represented Southern Illinois University Edwardsville during the 2016–17 NCAA Division I men's basketball season. The Cougars, led by second year head coach Jon Harris, played their home games at the Vadalabene Center in Edwardsville, Illinois as members of the West Division of the Ohio Valley Conference. They finished the season 6–24, 1–15 in OVC play to finish in last place in the West Division. They failed to qualify for the Ohio Valley Conference tournament.

Previous season 
The Cougars finished the 2015–16 season 6–22, 3–13 in OVC play to finish in fifth place in the West Division. They failed to qualify for the OVC tournament.

Preseason 
Six players, all of whom saw major playing time, returned from the 6–22 team of 2015–16. They were joined by two players who sat out last season as "redshirts" under NCAA transfer rules, four freshmen, and two walk-on players who earned roster spots in open tryouts. A fifth freshman joined the squad at the semester break, and he, another freshman, and a transfer student were redshirted. The one non-returning player transferred to a Division II school.

In a vote of Ohio Valley Conference head men’s basketball coaches and sports information directors, SIUE was picked to finish fifth in the OVC's West Division.

With a forbidding foreboding, the  Cougars lost their only exhibition game at home to the Division II McKendree Bearcats.

Regular season
The season started on a positive note with two wins at Hawaii. The Cougars then lost three in a row before winning two to raise their record to 4–3. They then lost the next six games (including another Division II loss) before beating Divisions II Missouri S&T in the final non-conference game.

The conference slate was a near-total disaster, as the Cougars pulled out their only OVC win  in their last game on Senior Night. With a 1–15 OVC record, SIUE did not qualify for the conference tournament.

Roster

Schedule and results

|-
!colspan=9 style=| Exhibition

|-
!colspan=9 style=| Non-conference regular season

|-
!colspan=9 style=| Ohio Valley Conference regular season

References 

SIU Edwardsville
SIU Edwardsville Cougars men's basketball seasons
Edward
Edward